Daniel Batalha Henriques (30 March 1966 – 4 November 2022) was a Portuguese Roman Catholic prelate.

Batalha Henriques was born in Portugal and was ordained to the priesthood in 1990 for the Patriarchate of Lisbon. He served as titular bishop of Aquea Thibiltanae and was the auxiliary bishop of the same Patriarchate from 2018 until his death in 2022.

References

1966 births
2022 deaths
Portuguese Roman Catholic bishops
21st-century Roman Catholic bishops in Portugal
Bishops appointed by Pope Francis
People from Lisbon